Anne Frank: The Biography is the first full biography of Holocaust diarist Anne Frank. Written by Melissa Müller it was initially published in 1998 in Germany. The book was the basis for the mini-series Anne Frank: The Whole Story (2001).

Summary

Anne Frank was born on 12 June 1929 to a lower or middle-class Jewish family in Frankfurt, Germany who feels the early threats of Nazism as Hitler rises to power in 1933. Soon her family and van dan emigrate to the Netherlands where Anne enjoys an idyllic life centred on school, socializing, boys and sleepovers. However, the situation changes quickly once Germany invades the Netherlands in May 1940. The family is soon forced to go into hiding with another family at the back building of the family business. While there Anne faithfully keeps a diary describing everyday situations and her thoughts and beliefs. After two years and one month, they are betrayed by still unknown parties and sent to concentration camps where they all perish with the exception of Anne's father, Otto Frank. The book ends with an afterword by one of the women who hid them, Otto Frank's secretary Miep Gies.

References

External links
 Interview with Müller on Anne Frank,  Booknotes, November 29, 1998 (C-SPAN)
 Presentation by Müller on Anne Frank at Harvard's Coop Bookstore, November 11, 1999 (C-SPAN)

1998 non-fiction books
German biographies
Biographies adapted into films
Books about Anne Frank
20th-century German literature